The Saint-Sulpice Seminary is a Catholic seminary run by the Society of the Priests of Saint Sulpice, located in Issy-les-Moulineaux, France.

History 
The Saint-Sulpice Seminary was established in 1641 in the village of Vaugirard (now part of Paris) by Jean-Jacques Olier, the founder of the Society of the Priests of Saint Sulpice. Two other priests, François de Coulet and Jean Du Ferrier, were also instrumental in its founding. When Olier was appointed the pastor of Saint-Sulpice Church in Paris in July or August 1642, he moved the seminary to that parish, where he remained superior of the seminary. He recruited several priests to teach with him, and adopted a new model for seminaries, in which adults from different areas where brought together for preparation for the priesthood, instead of adolescents who lived nearby. By the following year, the school had a faculty of 30 priests. On 23 October 1645 received its letters patent from the King Louis XIV. The seminary's newly completed building was blessed in 1651; this building would be demolished in 1802.

In 1655, the Society moved the seminary to its present-day location in Issy-les-Moulineaux. The building was built in the 16th century and was acquired by Queen Margaret of Valois in 1606. The property was then owned by the family of Alexandre Le Ragois de Bretonvilliers, who inherited it and bequeathed it to the Society upon his death in 1676.

Notable alumni 

 Peter Bourgade
 Louis William Valentine DuBourg
 Patrick Francis Healy

See also 

Saint-Sulpice Seminary (Montreal)

References

Citations

Sources

External links 

Catholic seminaries in France
1641 establishments in France
Society of the Priests of Saint Sulpice
Hauts-de-Seine